Afroedura pienaari, also known as Pienaar's rock gecko,  is a species of African geckos, first found in the Limpopo and Mpumalanga provinces of South Africa.

References

External links
Reptile database entry

Afroedura
Endemic reptiles of South Africa
Reptiles described in 2014